Cambridge is a city in Cowley County, Kansas, United States.  As of the 2020 census, the population of the city was 92.

History
Like many communities in Kansas, Cambridge owes its existence to a railroad. When the Kansas City, Lawrence & Southern Railroad was built a mile south of Lazette, a new site was organized by Benjamin H. Clover and plotted on May 3, 1880 and it was named Cambridge after Cambridge University, in England.   The first post office in Cambridge was established on January 30, 1880.

On December 15, 1880 the Atchison Topeka & Santa Fe Railway acquired nearly all the stock of the Kansas City, Lawrence & Southern Railroad and operated the railroad awhile as the Southern Kansas Railroad. Cambridge was a station and shipping point on the Atchison, Topeka and Santa Fe Railway.

Cambridge Public Emergency Radio Tower is one of two former emergency transmission facilities built during the Cold War.

Geography
Cambridge is located at  (37.317323, -96.667085). Cambridge is located on US Route 160 at State Highway 7. The community is 45 miles southeast of Wichita.

Climate
The climate in this area is characterized by hot, humid summers and generally mild to cool winters.  According to the Köppen Climate Classification system, Cambridge has a humid subtropical climate, abbreviated "Cfa" on climate maps.

Demographics

2010 census
As of the census of 2010, there were 82 people, 39 households, and 28 families living in the city. The racial makeup of the city was 98.8% White and 1.2% Native American. Hispanic or Latino of any race were 1.2% of the population.

There were 39 households, of which 25.6% had children under the age of 18 living with them, 61.5% were married couples living together, 2.6% had a female householder with no husband present, 7.7% had a male householder with no wife present, and 28.2% were non-families. 28.2% of all households were made up of individuals, and 12.8% had someone living alone who was 65 years of age or older. The average household size was 2.10 and the average family size was 2.54.

The median age in the city was 50.5 years. 19.5% of residents were under the age of 18; 1.2% were between the ages of 18 and 24; 18.3% were from 25 to 44; 41.5% were from 45 to 64; and 19.5% were 65 years of age or older. The gender makeup of the city was 51.2% male and 48.8% female.

2000 census
As of the census of 2000, there were 103 people, 46 households, and 31 families living in the city. The racial makeup of the city was 95.15% White, 0.97% African American, and 3.88% from two or more races.

There were 46 households, out of which 17.4% had children under the age of 18 living with them, 52.2% were married couples living together, 15.2% had a female householder with no husband present, and 32.6% were non-families. 28.3% of all households were made up of individuals, and 19.6% had someone living alone who was 65 years of age or older. The average household size was 2.24 and the average family size was 2.71.

In the city, the population was spread out, with 17.5% under the age of 18, 8.7% from 18 to 24, 24.3% from 25 to 44, 28.2% from 45 to 64, and 21.4% who were 65 years of age or older. The median age was 45 years. For every 100 females, there were 80.7 males. For every 100 females age 18 and over, there were 77.1 males.

The median income for a household in the city was $38,125, and the median income for a family was $53,500. Males had a median income of $25,625 versus $24,167 for females. The per capita income for the city was $19,413. There were 20.0% of families and 21.9% of the population living below the poverty line, including 47.1% of under eighteens and 42.9% of those over 64.

Education
The community is served by Central USD 462 public school district. The Central High School mascot is Central Raiders.
Cambridge High School was known as the Bulldogs.

References

Further reading

External links

 Cambridge - Directory of Public Officials
 Cambridge city map, KDOT

Cities in Kansas
Cities in Cowley County, Kansas